Katie Arup (born 29 April 1963) is a British fencer. She competed in the women's team foil event at the 1984 Summer Olympics.

References

External links
 

1963 births
Living people
British female foil fencers
Olympic fencers of Great Britain
Fencers at the 1984 Summer Olympics
Sportspeople from London